Jacob Geis (30 November 1890 – 22 July 1972) was a German theatre director, screenwriter and film producer. He wrote for 35 films between 1935 and 1959.

Selected filmography

 The Model Husband (1937)
 Five Million Look for an Heir (1938)
 The Roundabouts of Handsome Karl (1938)
 Drei Unteroffiziere (1939)
 Uproar in Damascus (1939)
 Between Heaven and Earth (1942)
 Nora (1944)
 Between Yesterday and Tomorrow (1947)
 Keepers of the Night (1949)
 The Appeal to Conscience (1949)
 The Falling Star (1950)
 The Exchange (1952)
 Red Roses, Red Lips, Red Wine (1953)
 A Girl Without Boundaries (1955)
 Beloved Enemy (1955)
 Regine (1956)
 The Model Husband (1956)
 All Roads Lead Home (1957)
 The Buddenbrooks (1959)

References

External links

1890 births
1972 deaths
Film people from Munich
20th-century screenwriters